Ford County (county code FO) is a county located in the U.S. state of Kansas. As of the 2020 census, its population was 34,287. Its county seat and most populous city is Dodge City. The county is named in honor of Colonel James Hobart Ford.

Geography

Adjacent counties
 Hodgeman County (north)
 Edwards County (northeast)
 Kiowa County (east)
 Clark County (south)
 Meade County (southwest)
 Gray County (west)

Major highways
  U.S. Route 50
  U.S. Route 54
  U.S. Route 56
  U.S. Route 283
  U.S. Route 400
  K-34

Demographics

The Dodge City Micropolitan Statistical Area includes all of Ford County.

As of the 2000 census, 33,848 people, 10,852 households, and 7,856 families were residing in the county. The population density was 30 people/sq mi (11/km2). The 11,650 housing units averaged 11/sq mi (4/km2). The racial makeup of the county was 75.3% White, 2.1%  African American, 1.0% Native American, 1.4% Asian, 0.2% Pacific Islander, 17.8% from other races, and 2.7% from two or more races.  Hispanic and Latino Americans of any race were 51.2% of the population.

Of the 10,852 households, 40.90% had children under the age of 18 living with them, 57.90% were married couples living together, 9.20% had a female householder with no husband present, and 27.60% were not families. About 22.70% of all households were made up of individuals, and 9.50% had someone living alone who was 65 years of age or older. The average household size was 2.92, and the average family size was 3.42.

In the county, the age distribution was 31.10% under  18, 11.20% from 18 to 24, 29.40% from 25 to 44, 17.30% from 45 to 64, and 11.00% who were 65 or older. The median age was 30 years. For every 100 females, there were 107.20 males. For every 100 females age 18 and over, there were 105.30 males.

The median income for a household in the county was $37,860, and for a family was $42,734. Males had a median income of $27,189 versus $22,165 for females. The per capita income for the county was $15,721. About 9.90% of families and 12.40% of the population were below the poverty line, including 15.40% of those under age 18 and 8.40% of those age 65 or over.

Government

Presidential elections
Ford County has been strongly Republican for most of its history, especially in recent elections. Only eight Democratic presidential candidates from 1880 to 2020 have carried the county, the most recent being Jimmy Carter in 1976.

Laws
Ford County was a prohibition, or "dry", county until the Kansas Constitution was amended in 1986 and voters approved the sale of alcoholic liquor by the individual drink with a 30% food sales requirement.

Education

Colleges
 Dodge City Community College

Unified school districts
 Spearville USD 381
 Dodge City USD 443
 Bucklin USD 459

Communities

Cities
 Bucklin
 Dodge City
 Ford
 Spearville

Census-designated places
 Fort Dodge
 Wilroads Gardens
 Wright

Other unincorporated places
 Bellefont
 Bloom
 Kingsdown
 Windhorst

Townships
Ford County is divided into 14 townships.  The city of Dodge City is considered governmentally independent and is excluded from the census figures for the townships.  In the following table, the population center is the largest city (or cities) included in that township's population total, if it is of a significant size.

Notable people

Numerous figures of the American Old West lived in Dodge City during its period as a frontier cowtown. These included, most notably, lawmen Wyatt Earp and Bat Masterson, and gunfighter Doc Holliday.

See also

 Golden Triangle of Meat-packing
 National Register of Historic Places listings in Ford County, Kansas

References

Further reading

 Handbook of Ford County, Kansas; C.S. Burch Publishing Co; 32 pages; 1887.
 Atlas and Plat Book of Ford County, Kansas;  Kenyon Co; 54 pages; 1916.
 Standard Atlas of Ford County, Kansas; Geo. A. Ogle & Co; 63 pages; 1906.

External links

County
 
 Ford County - Directory of Public Officials
Historical
 Ford County History from FCHS, Dodge City, KS
 Ford County GenWeb
  Ford County from American History and Genealogy Project (AHGP)
Maps
 Ford County Maps: Current, Historic, KDOT
 Kansas Highway Maps: Current, Historic, KDOT
 Kansas Railroad Maps: Current, 1996, 1915, KDOT and Kansas Historical Society

 
Kansas counties
1867 establishments in Kansas
Populated places established in 1867